Jake Aaron Matthews (born 19 August 1994) is an Australian mixed martial artist currently competing in the Ultimate Fighting Championship's Welterweight division.

Background
Born and raised in Melbourne, Australia, Matthews played Australian football for nine years in his youth, representing Northern Knights for a season. To keep fit in the offseason, began training in mixed martial arts out of a shed in the backyard of his parents' house, sparring with his younger brother and being coached by his father.

Mixed martial arts career

Early career
Matthews made his professional mixed martial arts debut at the age of 18 in September 2012 competing for regional promotions in the Greater Melbourne area where he compiled a record of 7–0 prior to joining the UFC.

The Ultimate Fighter: Nations
In December 2013, it was announced that Matthews would be a cast member on The Ultimate Fighter Nations: Canada vs. Australia, representing Australia at welterweight. Matthews went on to lose his opening fight in the tournament, dropping a unanimous decision to eventual finalist Olivier Aubin-Mercier and was subsequently eliminated from the show.

Ultimate Fighting Championship

2014 
After winning a fight after his stint on TUF, Matthews made his official UFC debut on 28 June 2014 at UFC Fight Night 43, where he faced promotional newcomer Dashon Johnson in a lightweight bout. Matthews defeated Johnson via submission in the third round.

For his second fight with the promotion, Matthews faced Vagner Rocha on 8 November 2014 at UFC Fight Night 55. Matthews won the fight via second round submission.

2015 
Matthews faced James Vick on 10 May 2015 at UFC Fight Night 65. He lost the fight via submission in the first round.

Matthews was expected to face Mickael Lebout on 18 July 2015 at UFC Fight Night 72. However, Matthews pulled out of the fight on 9 July citing injury and was replaced by promotional newcomer Teemu Packalen.

Matthews faced Akbarh Arreola on 15 November 2015 at UFC 193. Matthews won via doctor stoppage between rounds 2 and 3, after scoring a takedown early in the second round and inflicting severe damage to Arreola's right eye with punches and elbows.

2016 
Matthews faced Johnny Case on 20 March 2016 at UFC Fight Night 85. He won the bout via submission in the third round. Both participants were awarded Fight of the Night.

Matthews was expected to face Stevie Ray on 8 July 2016 at The Ultimate Fighter 23 Finale. However, Ray pulled out of the fight on 2 June citing alleged visa issues and was replaced by Kevin Lee. Lee won via TKO in the first round.

Matthews next faced Andrew Holbrook on 27 November 2016 at UFC Fight Night 101. He lost the fight via split decision.

2017 
Matthews faced Bojan Veličković in a welterweight bout on 19 November 2017 at UFC Fight Night 121. He won the fight via split decision.

2018 
Matthews faced Li Jingliang on 11 February 2018 at UFC 221. where he won via unanimous decision. This win earned him the Fight of the Night bonus. Jingliang later faced criticism for eye gouging Matthews whilst trying to escape a submission attempt.

Matthews faced Shinsho Anzai on 23 June 2018 at UFC Fight Night 132. He won the fight via rear-naked choke in the first round.

Matthews faced Anthony Rocco Martin on 2 December 2018 at UFC Fight Night 142. He lost the fight via an anaconda choke in round three.

2019 
Matthews faced Rostem Akman on 6 October 2019 at UFC 243. He won the fight via unanimous decision.

2020 
Matthews faced Emil Weber Meek on 23 February 2020 at UFC Fight Night: Felder vs. Hooker. He won the fight via unanimous decision.

Matthews faced Diego Sanchez on 27 September 2020 at UFC 253. Matthews knocked down Sanchez multiple times, and won the fight via unanimous decision.

2021 
Matthews faced Sean Brady on 6 March 2021 at UFC 259. He lost the fight via an arm triangle choke in round three.

Matthews was scheduled to face Jeremiah Wells on December 4, 2021 at UFC on ESPN 31. However, just hours before the event the bout was cancelled after one of Wells‘s cornermen tested positive for COVID-19.

2022 
Matthews faced André Fialho on June 11, 2022, at UFC 275. He won the bout via knockout in the second round. This win earned him the Performance of the Night award.

Matthews faced Matthew Semelsberger on December 17, 2022 at UFC Fight Night 216. He lost the fight via unanimous decision.

2023 

Matthews is next expected to face Gabe Green on May 13, 2023 at UFC Fight Night 224.

Personal life
Matthews has a daughter, Alani, who was born on 5 January 2019.

Championships and accomplishments
Ultimate Fighting Championship
Fight of the Night (Two times) 
Performance of the Night (One time)

Mixed martial arts record

|-
|Loss
|align=center|18–6
|Matthew Semelsberger
|Decision (unanimous)
|UFC Fight Night: Cannonier vs. Strickland
| 
|align=center|3
|align=center|5:00
|Las Vegas, Nevada, United States
|
|-
|Win
|align=center|18–5
|André Fialho
|KO (punches)
|UFC 275
|
|align=center|2
|align=center|2:24
|Kallang, Singapore
|
|-
|Loss
|align=center|17–5
|Sean Brady
|Submission (arm-triangle choke)
|UFC 259
|
|align=center|3
|align=center|3:28
|Las Vegas, Nevada, United States
|
|-
|Win
|align=center|17–4
|Diego Sanchez
|Decision (unanimous)
|UFC 253
|
|align=center|3
|align=center|5:00
|Abu Dhabi, United Arab Emirates
|
|-
|Win
|align=center|16–4
|Emil Weber Meek
|Decision (unanimous)
|UFC Fight Night: Felder vs. Hooker
|
|align=center|3
|align=center|5:00
|Auckland, New Zealand
|
|-
|Win
|align=center|15–4
|Rostem Akman
|Decision (unanimous) 
|UFC 243
|
|align=center|3
|align=center|5:00
|Melbourne, Australia
|
|-
|Loss
|align=center|14–4
|Anthony Rocco Martin
|Technical Submission (anaconda choke)
|UFC Fight Night: dos Santos vs. Tuivasa
|
|align=center|3
|align=center|1:19
|Adelaide, Australia
|
|-
|Win
|align=center|14–3
|Shinsho Anzai
|Technical Submission (rear-naked choke)
|UFC Fight Night: Cowboy vs. Edwards
|
|align=center|1
|align=center|3:44
|Kallang, Singapore
|
|-
|Win
|align=center|13–3
|Li Jingliang
|Decision (unanimous)
|UFC 221
|
|align=center|3
|align=center|5:00
|Perth, Australia
|
|-
|Win
|align=center|12–3
|Bojan Veličković
| Decision (split)
|UFC Fight Night: Werdum vs. Tybura
|
|align=center|3
|align=center|5:00
|Sydney, Australia
|
|-
|Loss
|align=center|11–3
|Andrew Holbrook
| Decision (split)
|UFC Fight Night: Whittaker vs. Brunson
|
|align=center|3
|align=center|5:00
|Melbourne, Australia
|
|-
|Loss
|align=center|11–2
|Kevin Lee
|TKO (punches)
|The Ultimate Fighter: Team Joanna vs. Team Cláudia Finale
|
|align=center|1
|align=center|4:06
|Las Vegas, Nevada, United States
|
|-
|Win
|align=center|11–1
|Johnny Case
|Submission (rear-naked choke)
|UFC Fight Night: Hunt vs. Mir
|
|align=center|3
|align=center|4:45
|Brisbane, Australia
|
|-
|Win
|align=center|10–1
|Akbarh Arreola
|TKO (doctor stoppage)
|UFC 193
|
|align=center|2
|align=center|5:00
|Melbourne, Australia
|
|-
|Loss
|align=center|9–1
|James Vick
|Submission (guillotine choke)
|UFC Fight Night: Miocic vs. Hunt
|
|align=center|1
|align=center|4:53
|Adelaide, Australia
|
|-
|Win
|align=center|9–0
|Vagner Rocha
|Technical Submission (rear-naked choke)
|UFC Fight Night: Rockhold vs. Bisping
| 
|align=center|2
|align=center|1:52
|Sydney, Australia
|
|-
|Win
|align=center|8–0
|Dashon Johnson
|Submission (triangle choke)
|UFC Fight Night: Te Huna vs. Marquardt
| 
|align=center|3
|align=center|3:16
|Auckland, New Zealand
|
|-
| Win
| align=center| 7–0
| Stuart Dare
| Decision (unanimous)
| Shamrock Events: King of Combat 12
|  
| align=center|3
| align=center|5:00
| Melbourne, Australia
| 
|-
| Win
| align=center| 6–0
| Dean Purdon
| Submission (rear-naked choke)
| Australian Fighting Championships 6
|  
| align=center|2
| align=center|2:42
| Melbourne, Australia
| |
|-
| Win
| align=center| 5–0
| Tadija Majic
| TKO (punches)
| Shamrock Events: Night of Mayhem 7
|  
| align=center|1
| align=center|2:25
| Melbourne, Australia
| 
|-
| Win
| align=center| 4–0
| Luke Jumeau
| Submission (rear-naked choke)
| Australian Fighting Championships 5
| 
| align=center|2
| align=center|1:14
| Melbourne, Australia
| |
|-
| Win
| align=center| 3–0
| Callan Potter
| Submission (triangle choke)
| Night of Mayhem 6
| 
| align=center|1
| align=center|1:42
| Melbourne, Australia
| 
|-
| Win
| align=center| 2–0
| Jason Zivkovic
| TKO (punches)
| Shamrock Events: Kings of Kombat 8
| 
| align=center|1
| align=center|0:23
| Melbourne, Australia
| 
|-
| Win
| align=center| 1–0
| Sam Fiamatai
| TKO (punches)
| Shamrock Events: Night of Mayhem 5
| 
| align=center|2
| align=center|1:47
| Melbourne, Australia
|

| Loss
| align=center| 0–1
| Olivier Aubin-Mercier
| Decision (unanimous)
| The Ultimate Fighter Nations: Canada vs. Australia
| 27 February 2014 (airdate)
| align=center|2
| align=center|5:00
| Quebec City, Quebec, Canada
|

See also
 List of current UFC fighters
 List of male mixed martial artists

References

External links

1994 births
Australian male mixed martial artists
Lightweight mixed martial artists
Sportspeople from Melbourne
Sportsmen from Victoria (Australia)
Living people
Australian practitioners of Brazilian jiu-jitsu
People awarded a black belt in Brazilian jiu-jitsu
Ultimate Fighting Championship male fighters
Mixed martial artists utilizing Brazilian jiu-jitsu
People from Epping, Victoria